American singer Christina Aguilera has performed on six concert tours, one promotional tour and one concert residencies. Additionally, she has performed at seventeen music festivals, and seven benefit concerts. She began her touring career in 2000, with Christina Aguilera in Concert. Originally held in North America in 2000 to promote her debut album, Christina Aguilera (1999), it was extended into 2001 following the release of Mi Reflejo (2000), with shows in Latin America and Asia. The tour was received well by critics, who complimented Aguilera's showmanship and vocals, which received comparisons to Mariah Carey and Whitney Houston. The touring act for Stripped (2002) was performed across two tours: The Justified & Stripped Tour with Justin Timberlake and The Stripped Tour. Lasting 45 shows, The Justified & Stripped Tour kicked off in June 2003 and became 16th highest-grossing tour of 2003. In September, Aguilera continued the tour without Timberlake, taking the show to Europe, Japan, and Australia until the end of the year. Her set was compared to Cher's image in the 1980s by several critics. An additional 29 dates were scheduled for 2004 with a new theme, but were cancelled after Aguilera suffered a vocal cord injury.

The Back to Basics Tour began in November 2006 and continued until October 2008, visiting cities in Europe, North America, Asia and Australia. With 61 dates throughout 2007, it was the highest grossing female artist tour of the year (second highest overall), with a revenue of $43,566,000 in that year. The tour was a critical and commercial success, receiving acclaim by contemporary critics, who complimented the tour's visuals, choreography, and Aguilera's on-stage attitude, and grossed a total of over $48.1 million from 82 dates. In 2010, Aguilera scheduled a 20 date North American summer tour in support of Bionic (2010) titled The Bionic Tour, which was scheduled to begin in July of that year. The tour was cancelled due to Aguilera's tight schedule for the promotion of the album and her film, Burlesque (2010). Aguilera did not tour again until 2018, to focus on her family. In 2016, Aguilera headlined the Mawazine festival in Rabat, Morocco. Her performance at the festival attracted a crowd of 250,000 people, beating the 160,000 people record set by Jennifer Lopez the year prior. Liberation (2018) was promoted through two tours. The Liberation Tour visited cities throughout North America, starting in September 2018 and concluding in December, grossing $8.7 million from 21 shows. It was named one of the best live shows by Billboard, and its gross ranked #132 out of Pollstar's Top 200 North American Tours year-end chart. The X Tour visited Europe starting in July 2019, and concluding with three shows in Mexico in December. It grossed over $5.4 million from nine reported shows.

Starting in May 2019, Aguilera headlined her first concert residency, officially named Christina Aguilera: The Xperience. It was held at the Zappos Theater at Planet Hollywood Las Vegas. Themed around outer space and retrofuturism, the show was a five-sensory experience. The residency was a critical and commercial success, grossing $10.2 million from its first four legs, and receiving acclaim. Aguilera was set to perform the final leg of The Xperience, as well as kick off a North American summer tour with Adam Lambert in 2020, but these plans fell through due to the COVID-19 pandemic. Aguilera returned to the stage with Christina Aguilera with the LA Phil, a two night set with the Los Angeles Philharmonic held on July 16 and 17, 2021. The shows were a commercial success, selling out the Hollywood Bowl for both nights, and received widespread acclaim from critics. In 2022 embarked on the EU/UK Summer Series promotional tour in support of her second Spanish-language album, Aguilera (2022). The tour consisted of five festival headlining shows and three arena shows in Scarborough, Liverpool, and London, with Union J as the opening act. Several of the shows were sold out. The set received positive reviews for it "dazzling and dramatic" nature.

According to Billboard, Aguilera's career gross is $81.7 million with an attendance of 1.5 million as of July 2019. Pollstar reports that Aguilera's total career gross as of November 2022 is $115,349,316 with an average gross of $613,000 and 9,855 tickets per concert.

Concert tours

Cancelled tours

Promotional tours

Concert residencies 

{| class="wikitable sortable plainrowheaders" style="text-align:center;" width="100%"
! scope="col" width="20%" |Title
! scope="col" width="11%" |Dates
! scope="col" width="15%" |Venue
! scope="col" width="16%" |Location
! scope="col" width="6%" |Shows
! scope="col" width="11%" |Gross
! scope="col" width="11%" | Gross in 
! scope="col" width="8%" |Attendance
! class="unsortable" scope="col" width="2%" |
|-
! scope="row" |Christina Aguilera: The Xperience
|–
|Zappos Theater at Planet Hollywood
|Las Vegas, Nevada, U.S.
|24
|$10.2 million
|$
|75,675
|
|- class="expand-child"
| colspan="9" style = "border-bottom-width:3px; padding:5px;" |
{{hidden
| headercss = font-size: 100%; width: 95%;
| contentcss = text-align: left; font-size: 100%; width: 95%;
| header = Christina Aguilera: The Xperience set list
| content = 

 "I Feel Love"
 "Your Body"
 "Bionic" 
 "Genie in a Bottle"
 "Reflection"
"Dirrty"
 "Vanity" / "Express" / "Lady Marmalade"
"Fall in Line"
 "Can't Hold Us Down" / "Boys Wanna Be Her"
 "Sick of Sittin'"
 "Maria"
 "Twice"
 "What a Girl Wants" / "Come On Over Baby (All I Want Is You)"
 "Ain't No Other Man"
 "You Are What You Are (Beautiful)"
 "Say Something"
 "Glam"
 "Candyman" / "I Want Candy"
 "Woohoo"
 Telepathy
"Accelerate"
"Feel This Moment" / "Desnudate"
 "Beautiful"
 "Fighter"
Encore
 "Let There Be Love"
}}
|-

|}

Stand-alone concerts 
{| class="wikitable sortable plainrowheaders" style="text-align:center;" width="100%"
! scope="col" width="14%" |Date
! scope="col" width="35%" |Title
! scope="col" width="23%" |Venue
! scope="col" width="16%" |Location
! class="unsortable" scope="col" width="2%" |
|-

|
! scope="row" |My Reflection
|Shrine Auditorium
|Los Angeles, California, U.S.
|
|- class="expand-child"
| colspan="5" style = "border-bottom-width:3px; padding:5px;" |

|-

|
! scope="row" |Back to Basics in London
|KOKO
|London, U.K.
|
|- class="expand-child"
| colspan="5" style = "border-bottom-width:3px; padding:5px;" |

|-

|
! scope="row" |VH1 Storytellers
|VH1 Studios
|New York City, New York, U.S.
|
|- class="expand-child"
| colspan="5" style = "border-bottom-width:3px; padding:5px;" |

|-

|
! scope="row" |2018 Formula One World Championship
|Baku Crystal Hall
|Baku, Azerbaijan
|
|- class="expand-child"
| colspan="5" style = "border-bottom-width:3px; padding:5px;" |

|-

|
! scope="row" |Christina Aguilera: The Xperience promotional concert
|iHeartRadio Theater
|Los Angeles, California, U.S.
|
|- class="expand-child"
| colspan="5" style = "border-bottom-width:3px; padding:5px;" |

|-

|–
! scope="row" |Christina Aguilera with the LA Phil
|Hollywood Bowl
|Los Angeles, California, U.S.
|
|- class="expand-child"
| colspan="5" style = "border-bottom-width:3px; padding:5px;" |
{{hidden
| headercss = font-size: 100%; width: 95%;
| contentcss = text-align: left; font-size: 100%; width: 95%;
| header = Christina Aguilera with the LA Phil set list
| content = 

 "At Last" / "Ain't No Other Man"
 "Genie In a Bottle"
 "The Voice Within"
 "Peaches" / "Can't Hold Us Down"
 "Maria"
 "Twice"
 "Say Something"
 "Dirrty"
 "Express / "Lady Marmalade"
 "Contigo en la Distancia"
 "What a Girl Wants"
 "It's a Man's Man's Man's World"
 "Fighter"
Encore
"Beautiful"
}}
|-

|
! scope="row" |Citi / AAdvantage Presents: Christina Aguilera
|Hollywood Palladium
|Los Angeles, California, U.S.
|
|- class="expand-child"
| colspan="5" style = "border-bottom-width:3px; padding:5px;" |

|-

|–
! scope="row" |Christina Aguilera Live in Chile
|Movistar Arena
|Santiago, Chile
|
|- class="expand-child"
| colspan="5" style = "border-bottom-width:3px; padding:5px;" |

|-

|}

Benefit concerts

Music festivals

See also 
 Christina Aguilera discography
 Christina Aguilera videography
 List of Christina Aguilera concert tours
 List of songs recorded by Christina Aguilera

Notes

References

External links 
 Christina Aguilera – official website

Christina Aguilera concerts
Aguilera